Herman Baertschiger Jr. is an American Republican politician from Oregon who is the chair and a member of the Josephine County Board of Commissioners. He previously served in the Oregon State Senate from 2013 to 2021, representing the  2nd district.  He was elected in 2012 and served as minority leader of the Oregon state senate from 2019 to 2021. Baertschiger served on the Senate Committee on Education and the Senate Committee on Finance and Revenue. During the 2013–2015 legislative biennium session, Baertschiger vice-chaired the Senate Committee on Rural Communities and Economic Development and served on the Senate Committee on General Government, Consumer and Small Business Protection.

Business career and personal life 
Baertschiger is the head of the forestry-based HB Company, Inc., and runs a small ranch near Grants Pass. He has three sons and was married to Leta, who died in 2017.

Political career 
Originally, Baertschiger faced a possible primary challenges from state senator Jason Atkinson and state representative Wally Hicks, but both men withdrew before filing. James Diefenderfer, a Democratic Party candidate, filed a last-minute challenge, but was defeated by an almost two-to-one margin.

In May and June 2019, state Senate Republicans staged two walkouts, denying quorum in an effort to stop a gross receipts business tax bill and a gas and energy tax bill, aimed to lower greenhouse gas emissions. The Senate holds 30 seats, but 1 is vacant due to a death. Without the Republican senators, the remaining 18 Democratic state senators could not reach a quorum of 20 to hold a vote.

In 2020 he declined to run for reelection.

Baertschiger was elected Josephine County Commissioner in May 2020.

References

External links
 County legislative website
 Senate legislative website 
 Campaign website

|-

21st-century American politicians
Businesspeople from Oregon
Living people
Republican Party Oregon state senators
People from Grants Pass, Oregon
Place of birth missing (living people)
Ranchers from Oregon
Year of birth missing (living people)